The 1923–24 National Challenge Cup was the annual open cup held by the United States Football Association now known as the Lamar Hunt U.S. Open Cup.

Overview
The Fall River Marksmen defeated Vesper Buicks of St. Louis by a score of 4–2.  Recent film of the final was discovered showing the 36th minute handball by Alex Kemp of the Marksmen which led to Vesper Buicks' first goal.  This is also the first known game in which soccer players wore numbers.

Bracket
Home teams listed on top of bracket

(*): replay after tied match
w/o: walkover/forfeit victory awarded

Final

See also
1924 American Cup
1924 National Amateur Cup

External links
 Film of final
 Open Cup Finals

References

U.S. Open Cup
Nat
Fall River Marksmen